Leung Uk is a village in Tai O, on Lantau Island, Hong Kong.

Administration
Leung Uk is a recognized village under the New Territories Small House Policy.

History
Leung Uk was probably first settled around 1800 by members of the Leung family (hence the name of the village), who were Hakkas. According to genealogical records, the first ancestor came to Tai O from a village near Shum Chun Market (today's Shenzhen). At the time of the 1911 census, Leung Uk had a population of 104.

During the Japanese occupation of Hong Kong, all villagers of Leung Uk were twice paraded en masse by Japanese troops, and were subsequently able to survive.

In 1955, Austin Coates described the village as having a population of 96, of the Leung, Chow, Man and Sin surnames. The village economy involved farming: vegetables, pigs and grass-cutting for sale to Shek Tsai Po for breaming.

References

External links
 Delineation of area of existing village Leung Uk (Tai O) for election of resident representative (2019 to 2022)

Villages in Islands District, Hong Kong
Tai O